Cibuco may refer to:

 Cibuco, Corozal, Puerto Rico, a barrio in Puerto Rico
 Cibuco, Vega Baja, Puerto Rico, a barrio in Puerto Rico
 Cibuco River, a river in Puerto Rico